Rodolfo Guaves (born 21 August 1953) is a Filipino former cyclist. He competed in the sprint and 1000m time trial events at the 1984 Summer Olympics and 1982 Asian Games.

References

External links
 

1953 births
Living people
Filipino male cyclists
Olympic cyclists of the Philippines
Cyclists at the 1984 Summer Olympics
Place of birth missing (living people)
Asian Games medalists in cycling
Cyclists at the 1982 Asian Games
Medalists at the 1982 Asian Games
Asian Games bronze medalists for the Philippines